Jackie Thomas Stump (January 13, 1948 – June 2, 2016) was an American coal miner, union leader, and politician who served in the Virginia House of Delegates. He resigned after being diagnosed with colon cancer in 2005, shortly after winning a ninth term. He was first elected as a write-in candidate, supported by United Mine Workers during the Pittston Coal strike.

References

External links
 
 

1948 births
2016 deaths
Democratic Party members of the Virginia House of Delegates
People from Lebanon, Virginia
20th-century American politicians
21st-century American politicians